Daraun is a village development committee in Syangja District in Gandaki Province of central Nepal. At the time of the 2011 Nepal census it had a population of 2286 people living in 582 individual households.
Daraun is located at western part of the district. This VDC is joined with Arjun Chaupari VDC, Putalibazar municipality and Panchamul VDC.

In Daraun VDC there are nine different caste, they are presented according to Nepal census 2011

References

Populated places in Syangja District